is a former Japanese football player.

Playing career
Imamura was born in Yamanashi Prefecture on July 11, 1976. After graduating from University of Tsukuba, he joined the newly promoted J2 League club, Ventforet Kofu based in his local area in 1999. On May 16, he debuted as a substitute defender in the 86th minute against Albirex Niigata. However, he only played in that one match and retired at the end of the 1999 season.

Club statistics

References

External links

1976 births
Living people
University of Tsukuba alumni
Association football people from Yamanashi Prefecture
Japanese footballers
J2 League players
Ventforet Kofu players
Association football defenders